The Voice of Finland (season 4) is the fourth season of the Finnish reality singing competition based on The Voice format. The season premiered on Nelonen on January 2, 2015.

The coaches are singer Tarja Turunen, Olli Lindholm, Redrama and Michael Monroe. Axl Smith hosts the program.

Teams 
Color Key

Episodes

The Blind Auditions

Episode 1: January 2, 2015

Episode 2: January 9, 2015

Episode 3: January 15, 2015

Episode 4: January 16, 2015

Episode 5: January 22, 2015

Episode 6: January 23, 2015

Episode 7: January 29, 2015

Episode 8: January 30, 2015

Episode 9: February 5, 2015

Episode 10: February 6, 2015

Battle rounds
During battle rounds, coaches divide contestants to pairs or triples and give them a song to perform. Coach then choose a winner to continue to the Knock Out phase. The losing contestant can still be stolen by another coach, as each coach can make two steals. Each coach is also joined by an adviser, with Michael Monroe being joined by Sami Yaffa from Hanoi Rocks, Olli Lindholm by singer Janna, Tarja Turunen by Samu Haber from Sunrise Avenue and Redrama by rapper Kasmir.

Colour key

Episode 11: February 13, 2015

Episode 12: February 20, 2015

Episode 13: February 27, 2015

The Knockouts

Color key:

Live shows
Colour key

Live 1 (March 22)

Live 2 (March 27)

Live 3 (April 3)

Semifinal (April 10)
Competition performances

Final (April 17) 
Competition performances

References

Elimination Chart

Overall

Color key
Artist's info

Result details

External links
The Voice of Finland Official website

4
2015 Finnish television seasons